Richard John Beyer (July 11, 1930 – March 7, 2019) was an American professional wrestler is best known by his ring names, The Destroyer and Doctor X. Among other places, he worked extensively in Japan and in 2017 he was awarded one of the country's highest honors, the Order of the Rising Sun.

Early life
As an athlete at Syracuse University, Beyer was a member of the varsity football and wrestling teams. He played in the 1953 Orange Bowl for Syracuse. He graduated with a master's degree in education and was a member of the Fraternity of Phi Gamma Delta's Syracuse Chapter, as well as an Eagle Scout in the Boy Scouts of America. He was a schoolteacher and swim coach in New York until he began his wrestling career. Beyer worked the first seven years of his mat career near his Western New York home, due in large part to his coaching job and commitment to the U.S. Army Reserve. Beyer also served as an assistant to Ben Schwartzwalder.

Professional wrestling career

Worldwide Wrestling Associates
Beyer began as a babyface wrestler in the mid-1950s, and he was voted 1955 Rookie of the Year by the Wrestling Life magazine. His career as masked wrestler The Destroyer began in 1962 in Los Angeles. Beyer traveled to California after Freddie Blassie praised Beyer’s heel skills to local promoter Jules Strongbow, who informed him he would wrestle as the masked Destroyer. Beyer's original mask was hard to see through and itchy, but Ox Baker lent him a mask made from a woman’s girdle, which served well for Beyer. He boasted about his East Coast academic background to help develop his heel character. He used the figure four leg lock (which became his signature finisher) on his way to the Worldwide Wrestling Associates (WWA) championship on July 27, 1962 in a win over Freddie Blassie, who convinced him that the mask gimmick would give him a large push. He defended the championship for ten months.

In early 1963, Beyer wrestled three sold-out matches against Giant Baba at the Olympic Auditorium in Los Angeles. In May 1963, he traveled to Japan for the first time in his career, to wrestle Rikidōzan in a match watched by over 70 million TV viewers, being Japan's highest rated show at the time. Beyer was also the last person to hold a victory over Rikidōzan before his death. In June 1964, he returned to Los Angeles and beat Dick the Bruiser for another WWA championship run, losing it to Bob Ellis in September, regaining it in November, and finally dropping it in March 1965 to Pedro Morales.

American Wrestling Association (1966–1972) 

Between 1966 and 1972, Beyer wrestled as Doctor X while in Minneapolis. He had matches with many of the top names in the business including his real brother-in-law Billy Red Lyons, who handed him his first American Wrestling Association (AWA) defeat on Minneapolis television, with a figure-four leglock. In August 1970, he took a chance at revenge against his former partner Blackjack Lanza. He stood in the center of the ring with announcer Marty O'Neill, who told the fans that Doctor X was a former coach from Syracuse University. Doctor X then removed his mask, handed it to promoter Eddie Williams, and wrestled the match as Dick Beyer. In other AWA cities, Beyer was unmasked by Lanza or Paul Diamond. In these matches, his name was said to be Bruce Marshall. He wanted to lose the mask because he and his family were set to go to Japan, where he would be The Destroyer again. During 1972, he had several battles with "Crippler" Ray Stevens. Their last match saw him written out of the AWA with a purported broken leg.

All Japan Pro Wrestling (1972–1993) 
From 1973 to 1979, Beyer wrestled in Japan on a deal with Giant Baba and NTV of Tokyo. He feuded with Mil Máscaras in a series of seven matches, stating on his style, "He was the best competitor that I ever wrestled. He never gave you anything – it's true – but I didn't give him anything either. You talk about a shoot or a half-shoot, and that's the kind of match that it was." He also helped promote All Japan Pro Wrestling (AJPW) for Baba and established himself as a gaijin tarento in a late-night TV show called Uwasa No Channel. His appearance on the musical-comedy show only furthered the Destroyer’s popularity in Japan, which led to him recording a Christmas album for his fans. He held the PWF United States Championship until 1979, when he left AJPW and the championship was abandoned. Beyer was also the first American wrestler signed to a Japanese promotion. His retirement match took place on July 29, 1993, where, he, his son Kurt Beyer, and Giant Baba defeated Haruka Eigen, Masanobu Fuchi, and Masao Inoue.

Later life and death

Beyer went into semi-retirement in Akron, New York, in 1984. Until 1995, he taught physical education in the Central School District, and coached football, wrestling and swimming. He served on the board of directors of the Cauliflower Alley Club, which holds annual reunions in Las Vegas. He was a member of Toastmasters International, a public speaking club, and carried the club designation of Certified Toastmaster. He inducted Gorgeous George into the WWE Hall of Fame on March 27, 2010.

On August 27, 2011, Beyer, along with his son, returned to Japan to take part in All Together, a charity event copromoted by AJPW, New Japan Pro-Wrestling and Pro Wrestling Noah. Appearing under his Destroyer mask, he hosted the Destroyer Cup and presented a trophy to its winner, Kentaro Shiga. In 2013, he opened Destroyer Park Golf in Akron, the first park golf course in the United States.

On November 4, 2017, the Japanese government awarded Beyer the Order of the Rising Sun, Gold and Silver Rays, for "a lifetime spent promoting goodwill and bi-cultural exchanges between Japan and the United States".

Beyer died in his bed at his home in Akron on March 7, 2019, at the age of 88, surrounded by his wife and all of his children. He had been suffering from health issues and spent time in hospice care.

Championships and accomplishments
50th State Big Time Wrestling
NWA North American Heavyweight Championship (Hawaii version) (1 time)
All Japan Pro Wrestling
All Asia Tag Team Championship (1 time) - with Billy Red Lyons
PWF United States Heavyweight Championship (4 times)
January 2 Korakuen Hall Heavyweight Battle Royal (1979)
January 3 Korakuen Hall Battle Royal (1975)
Champion Carnival Technical Award (1977)
Champion Carnival Fighting Spirit Award (1979)
American Wrestling Alliance
AWA World Tag Team Championship (San Francisco version) (1 time) - with Billy Red Lyons
American Wrestling Association
AWA World Heavyweight Championship (1 time)
Cauliflower Alley Club
Iron Mike Mazurki Award (1996)
Central States Wrestling
NWA United States Heavyweight Championship (Central States version) (1 time)
George Tragos/Lou Thesz Professional Wrestling Hall of Fame
Class of 2002
Lutte Internationale
Canadian International Heavyweight Championship (1 time)
NWA Big Time Wrestling
NWA World Tag Team Championship (1 time) - with Golden Terror
NWA Los Angeles
NWA International Television Tag Team Championship (Los Angeles version) (1 time) - with Don Manoukian
Pacific Northwest Wrestling
NWA Pacific Northwest Heavyweight Championship (2 times)
NWA Pacific Northwest Tag Team Championship (3 times) - with Art Michalik (3)
Professional Wrestling Hall of Fame and Museum
Class of 2005
New York State Award (2003)
Pro Wrestling Illustrated
Stanley Wetson Award (2017)
Ring Around The Northwest Newsletter
Tag Team of the Year (1963–1964) with Art Mahilik
Wrestler of the Year (1964)
Tokyo Sports
Popularity Award (1975)
World Wrestling Alliance (San Francisco)
WWA World Tag Team Championship (1 time) - with Billy Red Lyons
Worldwide Wrestling Associates
WWA International Television Tag Team Championship (1 time) - with Don Manoukian
WWA World Heavyweight Championship (3 times)
WWA World Tag Team Championship (2 times) - with Hard Boiled Haggerty
Wrestling Observer Newsletter awards
Wrestling Observer Newsletter Hall of Fame (Class of 1996)

References

External links 
 
 

1930 births
American male professional wrestlers
Schoolteachers from New York (state)
American male sport wrestlers
AWA World Heavyweight Champions
Masked wrestlers
Expatriate professional wrestlers in Japan
Expatriate television personalities in Japan
2019 deaths
Sportspeople from Buffalo, New York
Professional wrestlers from New York (state)
Professional wrestling trainers
Professional Wrestling Hall of Fame and Museum
People from Akron, New York
Recipients of the Order of the Rising Sun, 5th class
Stampede Wrestling alumni
20th-century professional wrestlers
All Asia Tag Team Champions
NWA Americas Tag Team Champions
PWF United States Heavyweight Champions